Senator Morrell may refer to:

Mike Morrell (born 1952), California State Senate

See also
Senator Morrill (disambiguation)